Karaha Crater or Kawah Karaha is a fumarole field in Java, Indonesia. It is an eroded crater from the last eruption in which its date is unknown. The field covers 250 × 80 m area and contains sulfur deposit.

See also 

 List of volcanoes in Indonesia

Volcanoes of West Java
Volcanic craters